This is a list of international presidential trips made by Jimmy Carter, the 39th president of the United States. Jimmy Carter made 12 international trips to 25 different countries on five continents—Africa, Asia, Europe, North America, and South America—during his presidency, which began on January 20, 1977 and ended on January 20, 1981.

Summary
The number of visits per country where President Carter travelled are:
 One visit to Austria, Belgium, Brazil, India, Iran, Israel, Italy, Liberia, Nigeria, Panama, Poland, Portugal, Saudi Arabia, South Korea, Spain, Switzerland, the United Kingdom, Vatican City, Venezuela, West Germany and Yugoslavia
 Two visits to France, Japan and Mexico
 Three visits to Egypt

1977

1978

1979

1980

Multilateral meetings
Multilateral meetings of the following intergovernmental organizations took place during President Carter's term in office (1977–1981).

See also
 Foreign policy of the Jimmy Carter administration
 Foreign policy of the United States

References

External links
 Travels of President Jimmy Carter. U.S. Department of State Office of the Historian.

Presidency of Jimmy Carter
20th century in international relations
1970s politics-related lists
1980s politics-related lists
Carter, Jimmy, international
Jimmy Carter-related lists